CopA-like RNA is a family of non-coding RNAs found on the R1 plasmid.

In several groups of bacterial plasmids, antisense RNAs regulate copy number through inhibition of replication initiator protein synthesis. These RNAs are characterised by a long hairpin structure interrupted by several unpaired nucleotides or bulged loops. In plasmid R1, the inhibitory complex between the antisense RNA (CopA) and its target mRNA (CopT) is characterised by a four-way junction structure and a side-by-side helical alignment.

See also 
Plasmid-mediated resistance (sRNA section)

References

External links
 

Antisense RNA